Thomas Eric Champion was an Anglican priest in the Twentieth century.

Champion was  educated at  Moore Theological College; and ordained deacon in 1937, and priest in 1938. After a curacy in Wairau, he was the incumbent at Picton. He was a Chaplain to the New Zealand Armed Forces during World War II. When peace returned he became Vicar of All Saints, Nelson; and Archdeacon of Waimea from 1949 until 1956.

References

20th-century New Zealand Anglican priests
Archdeacons of Waimea
University of New Zealand alumni
New Zealand military chaplains